Kesternich testing is a common name for sulfur dioxide testing. There are several test methods available, including DIN 50018, ISO 3231, and ASTM G87, which are some of the more common methods. Industrial objects (especially metal objects subject to corrosion) often are rated in Kesternich cycles (a measure of resistance to corrosion).

See also
For chambers to run this test see: Kesternich test

Sulfur